W. H. Smith Memorial School (full name William Henry Smith Memorial School) commonly known as Smith Memorial School is a co-ed secondary school (day school) in Sigra, Varanasi (India). It was established in 1958 by William Henry Smith, Cecelia Rose Wells and Pauline Sodhi.

History 
W. H. Smith Memorial School was started in "Satti", Varanasi in 1958 by William Henry Smith and Cecelia Rose Wells as a nursery school. The school was later shifted to its present location and upgraded to middle school. By 1987, the school was affiliated to the Council for the Indian School Certificate Examinations. By 1994, the school started offering education till secondary school level.

See also 
 List of educational institutions in Varanasi

References 

Primary schools in Uttar Pradesh
High schools and secondary schools in Uttar Pradesh
Schools in Varanasi
Educational institutions established in 1958
1958 establishments in Uttar Pradesh